The Agra–Lucknow Expressway is a 302 km long, 6-lane wide (extendable to 8-lanes) access-controlled expressway constructed by the Uttar Pradesh Expressways Industrial Development Authority (UPEIDA) to reduce traffic in already congested roads and to reduce pollution and carbon footprint. The expressway reduced the distance between the cities of Agra and Lucknow in the Indian state of Uttar Pradesh and is presently one of the India's longest operational expressway.

It was inaugurated on 21 November 2016 by then Chief Minister of Uttar Pradesh, Akhilesh Yadav. Light traffic commotion on the expressway began with government approval in the following December, and the full length of expressway was made accessible to public from Agra to Lucknow by the end of February 2017. It is widely seen as his dream project and the flagship model of development in the state, being the first of its kind to be completed in the shortest span of time.

Overview
It would cut travel time between Lucknow and Agra from 6 hours to 3:30 hours. The expressway is 6-lane wide (expandable to 8-lane in future) although the structures (major, minor bridges and underpasses) on the expressway are already being constructed as 8-laned to be in tune with the expanded width of the expressway in future. It is proposed on minimum distance and minimal agricultural land formula and will be financed by the Government of Uttar Pradesh. The Expressway will carry all public amenities via underpasses, service roads, provision for green belt, rest houses, petrol pumps, service centres, restaurants and four agricultural mandis for milk, potatoes, grains, fruits and vegetables.

Route & Exits

This expressway is connected to Yamuna Expressway through the Agra Ring Road, and thus providing an express link between Greater Noida, NCR to Lucknow via Agra. It connects Agra and Lucknow via Shikohabad, Firozabad, Mainpuri, Etawah, Auraiya, Kanpur, Kannauj, Unnao and Lucknow. The expressway will start at village Etmadpur Madra near Agra and will end at village Sarosa Bharosa near Mohan Road, Lucknow.

Rest Areas 
These are given below in direction of travel, as notably different from non-expressway custom, services on one side of the road are only meant for travelers for that side of the direction of travel, so only services created on left of the road are available to you but not the same available while traveling in other direction, usually, a similar set of service is created on other side of road at same spot or within few km. of other side facility.

 Eastbound (Agra to Lucknow) - There are two rest areas while going east:

1) About 100 km from Agra Toll Entrance

2) At 219 km from Agra Toll Entrance 

 Westbound (Lucknow to Agra) - These rest areas are available while going west:

1) At 105 km milestone from  Lucknow toll entrance.

2) At 205 km milestone from Lucknow toll entrance.

Toll rates
The toll rates applicable for the Agra Lucknow Expressway (as of January 2018) is given in the table below:

Construction

The construction work of 302 km long Agra–Lucknow Expressway was divided into 5 packages. The list of contractors is as follows:

Greenfield Project
The Agra-Lucknow Expressway is considered to be a Greenfield project as there were no work constraints of existing buildings or infrastructure. Uttar Pradesh Expressways Industrial Development Authority (UPEIDA) purchased almost 3,127 hectares of land without a murmur of dissent and decided to pay four times the circle rates (CR) to the land owners in rural areas and twice the CR in urban parts, as purchase cost. The rest of land was acquired through land acquisition method

Emergency Airstrip
Bangarmau Emergency Airstrip (Unnao district) 
 A group of six fighter jets of the Indian Air Force, comprising Sukhoi Su-30MKI and Dassault Mirage 2000, touched down to perform test runs on Agra-Lucknow expressway on the day of its inauguration.
 According to UPEIDA , "A dedicated 3 km stretch has been built for war-like emergencies on expressway."
 In May 2015, as a first military aviation in the country, IAF successfully landed a French Dassault Mirage-2000 fighter jet on the Yamuna Expressway near Raya village, Mathura, as a part of elaborate trials to see how many other highways can be used for war-like emergencies.
 In Oct 2017, IAF conducted a dedicated exercise and successfully landed/touched down French Dassault Mirage-2000, Sukhoi Su-30MKI, SEPECAT Jaguar, Lockheed C-130J Super Hercules fighter jets.

Controversy
It was alleged that some of the 3,500 hectare of land that was purchased for the route were artificially inflated in price by officials who then received kickbacks from the landowners. Lands that were in fact farmland were listed as residential, which gave them a higher value.

Status updates

 Nov 2013: No developers bid for this ₹9,000 crore project on a "build, own, operate and transfer" basis. Exclusion of provision for free land parcels across the expressway to developer was the main concern among participating developer companies for keeping them away from project.
 Jun 2014: Government of Uttar Pradesh decided to execute this project through state government financing, rather than private vendor financed basis, without provision for free land parcels across the expressway to developer companies. The Government of Uttar Pradesh invited bids in 5 packages for the Agra-Lucknow Expressway. Following this, 24 companies submitted their applications for 5 different patches of the expressway.
 Aug 2014: Through the bidding process developers are finalized who will be executing each of five sections simultaneously.  
 Sep 2014: 50% of the land required for the project is already acquired.
 Nov 2014: Foundation stone of Agra-Lucknow Expressway laid on 23 November 2014 by Mulayam Singh Yadav at an event in Hingot Kheria, Agra district. Around 7,000 acres acquired for this 15,000 Crores project. The target for the completion of the project is set to 22 months.
 May 2015: Work on two major bridges on Yamuna and Ganga river started. UP Chief Secretary, Alok Ranjan said that the expressway would be operational by the end of October 2016.
 Nov 2016: The expressway was inaugurated on 21 November 2016 by Chief Minister Akhilesh Yadav.
 Dec 2016: The expressway was partially opened to public from Lucknow till Shikohabad. As of 23 December 2016, only light vehicles were allowed to pass the stretch.
 Feb 2017: The expressway is opened to the public from Lucknow till Agra on 23 February 2017, but still road construction is happening at some places.
 Jan 2018: Toll collection starts by authorities wef 19 January 2018.
 Aug 2018: A 20 metre deep road caved-in at Wazidpur village near Dauki in Agra district. It's contractor PNC Infratech Ltd. blamed poor maintenance for this accident.

See also
 Expressways in India
 National Highways Development Project
 Purvanchal Expressway
 Eastern Peripheral Expressway
 Western Peripheral Expressway
 Yamuna Expressway (Greater Noida to Agra)
 Highway strip

References

External links
 REQUEST FOR PROPOSAL (RFP) (VOLUME - IV) FEASIBILITY REPORT

Expressways in Uttar Pradesh
Transport in Agra
Transport in Saifai
Transport in Lucknow